Stripes Stores is a chain of more than 700 convenience stores in Texas, Louisiana, New Mexico, and Oklahoma. The locations are former Circle K and Town & Country Food Stores. Other convenience store brands they operate under include IceBox and Quick Stuff. It is one of the largest non-refining operators of convenience stores in the United States.

In late 2017, all Stripes locations in Louisiana and parts of Texas were sold to 7-Eleven. 7-Eleven set out to buy all the Texas, New Mexico, and Oklahoma locations as well but could not get around a noncompete agreement with 7-Eleven franchises such as Delek US Holdings. However, 7-Eleven has since acquired the remaining Stripes locations following Delek terminating its franchising agreement and rebranding its stores as DK, with 7-Eleven remaining in those markets through Stripes and--in the case of El Paso, Texas--Speedway.

Many stores offer Sunoco, Chevron, Conoco, Exxon, Phillips 66, Shell, Texaco, Valero, and unbranded gasoline; most locations previously sold gasoline under the CITGO name, when the chain was Circle K. More than 300 locations also feature the proprietary Laredo Taco Company brand of Mexican fast food, or Country Cookin’ branded fast food.

In 2007, the company acquired the Town & Country Food Stores chain and in August 2009, it bought acquired 25 Quick Stuff convenience stores in Texas and Louisiana from Jack in the Box Inc.

In August 2014, Stripes was acquired by Houston-based Energy Transfer Partners, the parent company of East Coast gas brand Sunoco, when ETP bought Susser Holdings Corporation, which operated more than 580 stories at the time. The stores were then re-branded under the Sunoco and A-Plus names.

The headquarters are located in Corpus Christi, Texas.

References

External links 
 Stripes Stores
 Susser Holdings Corporation
 Sunoco LP
 Town & Country Food Stores

Companies based in Corpus Christi, Texas
Economy of the Southwestern United States
Convenience stores of the United States
Retail companies established in 1938
2014 mergers and acquisitions